"Nii või naa" is a song performed by Estonian singer Jüri Pootsmann. The song was released as a digital download on 3 June 2016 through Universal Music Group. The song peaked at number 2 on the Estonian Airplay Chart.

Track listing

Chart performance

Release history

References

2016 songs
2016 singles
Jüri Pootsmann songs